Hills of Valparaíso (Cerros Valparaíso) are the predominant geographical feature that rise above the main port area of Valparaíso in Chile.

In many cases the hills have communities tied to the name of the specific hills.  The sea level area below the hills with the four historical coastline is known as the 'plan' area, a term used after the 1906 earthquake for the project to rebuild the city 

The lower hills closer to the bay have Ascensores (Hill elevators or Funicular railways).

Some tourist promotion material claim that the city is formed from 42 hills. Some maps of the lower hills have other named hills identified making a different total.

In April 2014 in the upper hills around the top of Valparaiso a fire - known as the Great Fire of Valparaíso burned out of control, destroying 2,800 homes and killing 16 people, and displacing a large number of people

Notes